Barolineocerus is a genus of leafhoppers in the family Cicadellidae.

Description

The head is yellow to white with brown margins on the face. The pronotum is yellowish white in the middle bordered with
white and a thick black line on the posterior margin with the remainder of the pronotum being brown.  The wings are yellow to yellow green with white borders and a thick black
line on the posterior border.

Species
These 9 species belong to the genus Barolineocerus:

 Barolineocerus acius Freytag, 2008
 Barolineocerus apiculus Freytag, 2008
 Barolineocerus bispinus Freytag, 2008
 Barolineocerus chiasmus Freytag, 2008
 Barolineocerus declivus Freytag, 2008
 Barolineocerus elongatus Freytag, 2008
 Barolineocerus furcatus Freytag, 2008
 Barolineocerus ornatus Freytag, 2008
 Barolineocerus spinosus Freytag, 2008

References

Eurymelinae
Cicadellidae genera